A longevity peach, or shoutao, is a type of lotus seed bun, sometimes with a filling made of red bean paste or lotus paste. It is white with a red dyed tip with a crease along the side, mimicking the shape of a peach. Occasionally, bakers add green decorations that mimic leaves. The longevity peach is a representation of Peaches of Immortality. According to Chinese folk legends, these peaches ripen every thousands of years, and grant immortality to humans when consumed.

The pastry is typically served at the birthdays of elderly people to celebrate their achievement in having reached old age.

See also
 List of buns
 List of steamed foods

References

Dim sum
Sweet breads
Chinese bakery products
Steamed buns